Emmanuel Glacier is a glacier in the Royal Society Range of Victoria Land, descending from Mount Lister northwestward between Table Mountain and Cathedral Rocks to enter Ferrar Glacier. It was named by the British Antarctic Expedition, 1910–13, after Emmanuel College, Cambridge, England.

See also
 List of glaciers in the Antarctic
 Glaciology

References 

Royal Society Range
Glaciers of Scott Coast